Guglielmo Andreoli (9 January 1862 - 26 April 1932) was an Italian pianist, music teacher and composer.

He was born in Mirandola, Modena, to the musical family of Evangelista Andreoli (1810-1875). He shared his name with his older brother Guglielmo, who had died nearly two years before his birth. He was also the brother of Carlo Andreoli.

He received his earliest lessons on piano and organ from his father. From 1876 he studied at the Milan Conservatory with Polibio Fumagalli (organ), Giovanni Rampazzini (violin) and Antonio Bazzini (composition). In 1877-1887, he assisted his brother Carlo in organizing a series of 96 symphonic concerts called the Società dei Concerti Sinfonici Popolari. He taught harmony, counterpoint and piano at the Milan Conservatory. His pupils included Victor de Sabata.

Andreoli's compositional legacy includes a symphonic fantasy and two overtures for orchestra, Requiem, string quartet, piano and vocal compositions. Andreoli edited the Italian edition of the works of Beethoven, Mendelssohn, Weber, Ignaz Moscheles, Joachim Raff, and Chopin. He also published a textbook of harmony (1898, in collaboration with Edgardo Codazzi) and oversaw the release of the Italian music pedagogy at the European level of theoretical training.

A music school in his hometown Mirandola is named in honor of the Andreoli brothers.

Notes

References

 Marco Bolzani. Gli Andreoli di Mirandola e i Concerti Popolari milanesi (1877—1887). — Edizioni «Al Barnardon», 1988.

Milan Conservatory alumni
1862 births
1932 deaths
Italian classical pianists
Male classical pianists
Italian male pianists
Italian male composers
Italian classical composers
People from Mirandola
19th-century Italian composers
19th-century classical pianists
19th-century classical composers
20th-century Italian composers
20th-century classical pianists
20th-century classical composers
Academic staff of Milan Conservatory
20th-century Italian male musicians
19th-century Italian male musicians